Gods and Monsters is the third album by English rock band I Am Kloot which was released on 11 April 2005. It reached #74 in the UK. As well as being released on vinyl and CD, the CD version of the album also appeared in a gate-fold sleeve edition with a second disc: a DVD titled Live At The Ritz + Videos which contained filmed live tracks from a gig, music videos, and a band interview.

Overview
The semi-autobiographical lead single from this album "Over My Shoulder", about relationships ending, was featured occasionally on MTV.  Lead singer Bramwell refers to the "Night and Day" club in Manchester where he used to work and where I Am Kloot got their first break. The track "Avenue of Hope" featured in the closing credits of the Danny Boyle film Sunshine in 2007. The cover art is by poster artist Jay Ryan.

Album details

Track listing

Music Credits
I Am Kloot
 John Bramwell
 Andy Hargreaves
 Peter Jobson
 Additional instruments
 Robert Marsh – trumpet in "Avenue of Hope"
 Norman McLeod – pedal steel guitar in "Avenue of Hope" and "I Believe"
 Production and mixing
 Joe Robinson – production and mixing
 Dan Broad – engineering

Album artwork 
 Jay Ryan

Disc II: Live At The Ritz + Videos DVD 
The Live At The Ritz + Videos DVD was produced by film, multimedia, and transmedia artist Krishna Stott, later known for the award-winning interactive film projects Crimeface (2008) and Codename Winterhill (2015). Stott first worked with the band directing the music video to their single 'Life in a Day' (June 2003), the song taken from I Am Kloot's self-titled second album. Following the release of that album, Stott and camera operator Alex Perry traveled with the band on their late 2003 UK and European support tour filming sections of gigs, as well as filming the entire concert at The Ritz club in Manchester with a full crew. The intention was to use the filmed material in some way at a future date. More immediately, footage from both the Manchester concert and other gigs would be used by Stott to create the music video for the band's next single from I Am Kloot, 'From Your Favourite Sky'. Stott would also go on to direct a third music video from I Am Kloot, the single "Proof" (June 2004), featuring the actor Christopher Eccleston.
As I Am Kloot were preparing the release of their third album Gods and Monsters in 2005, Stott was asked to produce the second disc using the live filmed material from the Ritz, include some of the band's music videos, and to specially film a band interview.

Live At The Ritz
A selection of live songs from a gig filmed on 12 October 2003 at The Ritz in Manchester by director Krishna Stott as a Retina Circus production. All the songs selected for the DVD come from their previous album I Am Kloot, the filming taking place very soon after its release. The rest of the filmed footage from the gig resides in the Retina Circus archive and is yet to be released.

Credits
Stage:
 Bob Sastry – horn in "The Same Deep Water as Me"
 Troupe (female dance group) – dance in "3 Feet Tall" and "Life in a Day"
 Richard Knowles – live sound
 Dave Morrisey – lighting
Filming:
 Krishna Stott (Retina Circus Productions) – directing and production
 Alex Perry, Jon Hillyer, Jared Roberts, Russell Moss, Jenna Collins, Philip Shotton, Wayne Simmonds – camerawork
 Scott Abrahams and Alex Perry – editing
 Julian Gaskell – live sound recording
 I Am Kloot and Julian Gaskell – audio mixing
 Krishna Stott and Julian Gaskell – mastering

Videos

Credits
Music videos:
 "Life in a Day" – directed by Krishna Stott
 "From Your Favourite Sky" – directed by Krishna Stott
 "Three Feet Tall" – directed by Sam Brown
Interview:
 Krishna Stott - director
 Danny Moran – conducting
 Mark Kennard – heads illustration (same as visible on the artworks of singles "Titanic/To You" and "Twist/86 TV's")
 Jon Hillyer – camera
 Mark Schofield – sound
 Alex Perry and Krishna Stott – editing

Singles

References 

2005 albums
I Am Kloot albums